Symmetrischema capsicivorum is a moth in the family Gelechiidae. It was described by Povolný in 1973. It is found in Peru.

References

Symmetrischema
Moths described in 1973